Magda Linette was the defending champion but chose to compete at the 2022 Western & Southern Open instead.

Kamilla Rakhimova won the title, defeating Mirjam Björklund in the final, 6–2, 6–3.

Seeds

Draw

Finals

Top half

Bottom half

References

External Links
Main Draw

2022 Singles
Bronx Open - Singles